The Close Combat Badge (or CCB) was an approved badge that was never issued. It was quickly scrapped and replaced by the Combat Action Badge.

The U.S. Army would have awarded the CCB to armor, cavalry, combat engineer, and field artillery soldiers in military occupational specialties. It could also have been awarded to corresponding officer branch/specialties recognized as having a high probability to routinely engage in direct combat, and they must be assigned or attached to an army unit of brigade or below that is purposely organized to routinely conduct close combat operations and engage in direct combat in accordance with existing rules and policy.

United States military badges